The following buildings were added to the National Register of Historic Places as part of the Lee County Multiple Property Submission (or MPS).

Notes

External links
 Lee County listings at Florida's Office of Cultural and Historical Programs

Gallery

 Lee County Buildings
National Register of Historic Places Multiple Property Submissions in Florida